Sevim  is a common feminine Turkish given name. In Turkish, "Sevim" means "Charm" and/or "Appeal".

People

Given name
 Sevim Burak (1931–1983), Turkish author
 Sevim Dağdelen (born 1975), German politician of Turkish origin and a member of the Left Party
 Sevim Demircan (born 2000), Turkish para-atlete
 Sevim Tanürek (1944–1998), Turkish classical music singer
 Sevim Tekeli (1924–2019), Turkish historian of science

Turkish feminine given names
Turkish-language surnames